Helen Hughes (January 8, 1918 - April 3, 2018) was an American-Canadian actress who has worked in theatre, television, and film.

Biography
Helen Hughes was born in the Johnstown, Pennsylvania, where she worked as an art teacher, editor and actress. Although she acted while she was in college, her undergraduate degree (from Indiana State University) and her graduate study (at Penn State) both focused on teaching art.

In 1938, Hughes was interviewed on Kate Smith's radio program as one of "the outstanding radio actresses from representative American cities".

She became a permanent resident of Canada in 1972. Her move resulted from acting opportunities, when she performed in 10 weeks of summer theatre in Canada. "I discovered that I loved Canada", she said. A contributing factor in her move was that her marriage had broken up. With her children grown, she felt free to make a change.

She was nominated for a Dora Mavor Moore Award in 1986. She made her last appearance at age 96, as a guest actress in the TV series Sensitive Skin.

In 1980, Hughes starred in The 75th at the Lunchbox Theatre. in Alberta, Canada.

At the 10th Genie Awards in 1989, she received a nomination for Best Supporting Actress for her performance in the film Martha, Ruth and Edie.

Hughes also made TV commercials for American Express, Anacin, and one for Heinz ketchup that ran for about three years.

Selected filmography

References

External links 
Helen Hughes works
 

1918 births
2018 deaths
American emigrants to Canada
People from Johnstown, Pennsylvania
Actresses from Pennsylvania
American centenarians
Canadian centenarians
Canadian film actresses
20th-century Canadian actresses
Women centenarians
Indiana State University alumni